Ilex shimeica is a species of plant in the family Aquifoliaceae. It is endemic to China.

References

Endemic flora of China
shimeica
Endangered plants
Taxonomy articles created by Polbot
Plants described in 1963